The Iris class consisted of two ships,  and , built for the Royal Navy in the 1870s. They were the first British all-steel warships.

Design and description
The Iris-class ships were designed as dispatch vessels by William White under the direction of Nathaniel Barnaby, Director of Naval Construction, and were later redesignated as second-class protected cruisers. They displaced  at normal load and were the first British warships with an all-steel hull. Their crew consisted of 275 officers and ratings. The ships were not armoured but extensive internal subdivision gave them some protection against flooding, as did the  double bottom under the propulsion machinery compartments.

All cylinders had a  stroke. They were initially fitted with a barque sailing rig, but this was removed after a few years.

The Iris-class ships were originally armed with ten 64-pounder rifled muzzle-loading (RML) guns, eight on the main deck and the remaining pair on the upper deck on pivot mounts to serve as chase guns fore and aft.

Ships

Construction and career
Iris was launched in 1877 and sold in 1905 while Mercury, launched a year later, was hulked at Chatham in 1914 and sold for scrap in 1919.

Citations

Bibliography

 

Cruiser classes
 
Ship classes of the Royal Navy